The Tomb of Zuo Zongtang is the tomb of Zuo Zongtang, a Chinese statesman and military leader of the late Qing dynasty. The tomb dates from 1886, and is located in Tiaoma Town of Yuhua District, Changsha, Hunan, China. It has been categorized as a provincial level key cultural heritage in 1996 by the Hunan Provincial Government.

History
The tomb was built for Zuo Zongtang, who was a statesman and military leader of the late Qing dynasty. The tomb is located in Tiaoma Town of Yuhua District, Changsha, Hunan. When Zuo Zongtang died in 1885 in Fuzhou, Fujian, he was buried in here in the following year. 

During the Cultural Revolution, the Red Guards blasted open an entrance way and entered the tomb, Zuo Zongtang's body was dumped in the wild.

In 1986, during the 100th anniversary of Zuo Zongtang's death, Hunan Provincial Government rebuilt the tomb.

In January 1996, it has been designated as a provincial key cultural unit.

Public Access
The Tomb of Zuo Zongtang open to visitors for free, and is open from 9:00 am to 17:00 pm daily.

Gallery

References

Buildings and structures in Changsha
Buildings and structures completed in 1886
Tourist attractions in Changsha
1886 establishments in China
Historical and Cultural Sites Protected at the Provincial Level in Hunan
Yuhua District, Changsha
Zuo Zongtang